The Adventures of Paddington (French: Les aventures de Paddington) is an animated television series developed for television by Jon Foster and James Lamont. The series is co-produced by Heyday Films and StudioCanal, with the participation of Nickelodeon, M6 and Piwi+. The animation for the series is produced by Blue-Zoo Animation Studio and Superprod Studio. The series is based on the Paddington Bear franchise. The series airs on Nickelodeon internationally, except in France where the series airs on Gulli and later on M6 and Piwi+.

The second season premiered on February 19, 2021. In July 2021, StudioCanal confirmed a third season was in development.

Premise 
The show centers on a younger Paddington as he writes letters to his Aunt Lucy celebrating the new things he's discovered throughout the day.

Characters 
 Paddington Bear (voiced by Ben Whishaw, reprising his role from the films) — a young, kind, and polite Peruvian bear who moved to London after an earthquake destroyed his home. He lives with the Brown family—Henry, Mary, Judy, and Jonathan—and next door to Mr. Curry. He is liked by everyone except Mr. Curry.
 Henry Brown (voiced by Darren Boyd) — the husband of Mary and the father of Judy and Jonathan.
 Mary Brown (voiced by Morwenna Banks) – the wife of Henry and the mother of Judy and Jonathan.
 Mrs. Bird (voiced by Phyllis Logan) — a distant relative of the Browns who lives with the family. She is very wise and looks after the house, doing all the cooking and cleaning. She also speaks in a Scottish accent.
 Jonathan Brown (voiced by Bobby Beynon) — the son of Henry and Mary.
 Judy Brown (voiced by Sabrina Newton-Fisher in season 1, Angeli Wall in season 2) — the daughter of Henry and Mary.
 Mr. Curry (voiced by Reece Shearsmith) — the Browns' grumpy neighbour, an elderly bachelor with a negative predisposition.
 Mr. Gruber (voiced by David Schofield) — a benevolent shopkeeper and Paddington's best friend.
 Aunt Lucy  — a  female bear that lives in Darkest Peru, she is Paddington’s aunt and the series centres on his letters to her explaining his adventures in London. She does not directly appear in the series, only in the opening credits.
 Ms. Pots (voiced by Liz Sutherland) — a local Windsor Gardens resident who runs the local town groups, provides music lessons, and is friends with the Brown family.
 Sofia (voiced by Monica Lopera) — runs the local cafe, and is the mother of Mateo.

Production 
The Adventures of Paddington was first announced on 14 February 2019 as part of Nickelodeon's 2019 upfront under the working title Paddington, and the series' release date was later announced on 20 November 2019 with a new title, "The Adventures of Paddington". Ben Whishaw reprises his role as Paddington Bear from the two Paddington films. Gary Barlow composed, wrote, and performed the theme song for the series.

Episodes

Broadcast 
The Adventures of Paddington premiered on Nickelodeon in the United States on 20 January 2020. A sneak-peek premiere of the first episode aired on 20 December 2019. It is set to premiere on M6 in France on a date to be determined, although the series would eventually premiere in the country on Gulli. In the United Kingdom, the series was premiered on Nick Jr. on 2 March 2020 and it first aired on Channel 5's Milkshake! block on 5 October. It started on Nick Germany in April 2020. The series first aired on Nick Jr. in Croatia on 31 October. The series also began airing in April 2021 on Nick Junior in Poland, where episodes can be watched in English.

Awards
The series won at the 2021 Daytime Emmys for Outstanding Pre-School Children's Animated Series.

References

External links 
 
 

2020s British animated television series
2020 British television series debuts
2020s French animated television series
2020 French television series debuts
Animated television series about bears
Animated television series reboots
Annie Award winners
Nick Jr. original programming
Television series by StudioCanal
British children's animated adventure television series
British computer-animated television series
British television shows based on children's books
English-language television shows
French children's animated adventure television series
French computer-animated television series
French television shows based on children's books
Paddington Bear